No. 15 Sector RAF is a former Royal Air Force Sector that was operational during both the First and the Second World Wars.

First World War

Reserve Army Wing was formed on 21 June 1916, it renamed to 15th Corps Wing RFC on 24 June 1916 it moved to Arqueves, Watvin, La Lovie, St. Andre-Aux-Bois, Proyart, Villers-Carbonnel, Daours, Drucat, Bertangles Town, Vaux-En-Amienois, Nicolas, Querrieu, Cartigny, Elincourt and finally to Germinnes Chateau where it disbanded on 20 March 1919.

It controlled various squadrons such as: 3, 4, 5, 6, 7, 8, 9, 12, 15, 21, 23, 32, 35, 52, 53, 57, 59, 73, 82, 101, 205 and 3rd Australian Flying Corps.

Second World War

No. 15 (Fighter) Wing RAF was formed on 15 August 1943 at RAF Kingsnorth within No. 83 Group RAF controlling:
 No. 122 Airfield RAF
 No. 125 Airfield RAF
 No. 129 Airfield RAF (from 20 April 1944)
Shortly afterwards on 5 October 1943 the wing moved to RAF Newchurch, then to RAF Detling on 10 October 1943.On 15 April 1944 the wing moved to RAF Ford. The wing was disbanded on 12 May 1944.

No. 15 (Fighter) Sector was formed on 12 May 1944 at RAF Ford controlling:
 No. 125 Wing RAF
 No. 129 Wing RAF
 No. 144 Wing RAF
The sector moved to RAF Old Sarum on 13 June 1944,  then to Southampton on 21 June 1944 before moving to Martragny on 22 June 1944 where the sector disbanded on 12 July 1944.

See also
 List of wings of the Royal Air Force

References

Citations

Bibliography

Sector 15